Dan Gordon  is a Gaelic footballer from County Down. He plays for the Down senior inter-county football team and with his local club Loughinisland GAA. He briefly retired from the Down team in 2010 but returned at the start of the 2010 season. Dan made his first championship start in 2002 where Down played Donegal.

He started at full back in the 2010 All-Ireland Football Final where Down were defeated 0-15 to 0-16 by Cork.

Honours
Winner
 Railway Cup (4) 2004 2007 2009 2012
 Dr. McKenna Cup (1) 2008 (c) 
 Irish News All Star (1) 2012
Runner Up
 Down Senior Football Championship (2) 2008 2009
 National Football League Division 2 (2) 2004 2010
 Ulster Senior Football Championship (2) 2003 2012
 All-Ireland Senior Football Championship (1) 2010
 National Football League Division 3 (1) 2009 (c)
 Railway Cup (1) 2005

References

External links
GAA Info Profile

Year of birth missing (living people)
Living people
Down inter-county Gaelic footballers
Loughinisland Gaelic footballers
Ulster inter-provincial Gaelic footballers